Rubén D'Andrilli (born 8 October 1962) is an Argentine rower. He competed at the 1984 Summer Olympics and the 1988 Summer Olympics.

References

1962 births
Living people
Argentine male rowers
Olympic rowers of Argentina
Rowers at the 1984 Summer Olympics
Rowers at the 1988 Summer Olympics
Place of birth missing (living people)
Pan American Games medalists in rowing
Pan American Games silver medalists for Argentina
Pan American Games bronze medalists for Argentina
Rowers at the 1983 Pan American Games
Rowers at the 1987 Pan American Games
20th-century Argentine people
21st-century Argentine people